Miejski Klub Sportowy Ruch Zdzieszowice (MKS Ruch Zdzieszowice) is a football club in Zdzieszowice, Opole Voivodeship. Ruch plays in the IV liga. They play home games at the Stadion Miejski. The club also has other sports sections including weightlifting, cycling, cards, women's football, athletics, and boxing.

History
Before 1965 the club went under many different names such as "Robotniczy" Sports Club, "Anna" and "Unia". Finally in 1965 the club was named "Ruch" and still harbors this name to the present day.

Since the beginning of the reign football club, the women's handball teams have enjoyed a lot of success. In the '70s, Małgorzata Wieczorek, Brygida Paterok and other girls with Zdzieszowice constituted the core team at that time Polish champions - Otmętu Krapkowice.

The faithful fans of the club are pensioners, they are exempt from payment of premiums and the club includes events for free. In the '90s Jerzy Woźniak was president - chairman of the Committee of NSZZ Solidarity Works. In his younger years as a football player, he played Start Łódź and after arriving in 1974 he played in Zdzieszowice for the colors of Crown Krępna LZS.

It is worth noting that in years past, on the occasion of "Player of the Day", Zdzieszowice has hosted such clubs as the Ruch Chorzów, Raków Częstochowa, Polonia Bytom and Zagłębie Sosnowiec.

Since the 2006/07 season the club's president has been Krystian Chmiel, from that moment the club has successively been promoted to a higher class of leagues and in the 2008/09 season was promoted to III Liga Opole-Silesia.

In 2007 the club completed the renovation of the stadium. From now on the team  has one of the nicest facilities in the Opole region. Perfect turf with drainage, and covered grandstand that make watching games a treat for the fans.

Club honours
 6th in II Liga (Western Group) - 2010–11
 3x Opolski Polish Cup - 2008–09, 2009–10, 2020–21

References

External links
 Official Website

Football clubs in Poland
Association football clubs established in 1946
1946 establishments in Poland
Multi-sport clubs in Poland
Football clubs in Opole Voivodeship
Krapkowice County